Foreshores is a coastal rural locality in the Gladstone Region, Queensland, Australia. The area is used for farming with some rural residential development.

Geography 
The locality is bounded to the north by the Coral Sea. It includes both a mainland component to the south and Hummock Hill Island to the north, which are separated by the Colosseum Inlet. There are wetlands on both sides of the inlet. The crossing between the mainland and the island is sufficiently shallow that sheep can cross at low tide.

The Bruce Highway and the North Coast railway line pass through the south-western part of the locality from Bororen to Iveragh.

All parts of the sea within the locality are within the Great Barrier Reef Coast Marine Park. The south-western corner of the locality is within the Castle Tower National Park.

The land along Intrepid Drive is used rural residential purposes. Otherwise the predominant land use is grazing on native vegetation with a small area of plantation timber. As at 2019, there is no land use on Hummock Island.

History 
The origin of the locality is not recorded, but presumably relate to its coastal location.

In 1916, Thomas Farmer was successfully raising sheep on the island.

In 1921, John James Athelstane Murray (1859-1936), son of John Murray, purchased Hummock Hill Island and lived there until his death in 1936.

Education 
There are no schools in Foreshores. The nearest government primary schools are in Bororen State School in neighbouring Bororen to the south and Benaraby State School in Benaraby to the west. The nearest government secondary school is Tannum Sands State High School in Tannum Sands to the north-west.

Proposed development 
In 2019, the Queensland Government conditionally approved a residential and tourist development on Hummock Hill Island. The development will consist of 2,500 residences with 770 of them intended for permanent housing, along with an airstrip, shops and a golf course and is expected to cost $1.2 billion. It includes a bridge from the mainland to the island. The Gladstone Regional Council has opposed the development.

References 

Gladstone Region
Coastline of Queensland
Localities in Queensland